Weston is a town in Aroostook County, Maine, United States. The population was 245 at the 2020 census.

Geography

Demographics

2010 census
As of the census of 2010, there were 228 people, 112 households, and 68 families living in the town. The racial makeup of the town was 95.2% White, 0.4% African American, 0.9% Native American, 0.9% Asian, and 2.6% from two or more races. Hispanic or Latino of any race were 1.8% of the population.

There were 112 households, of which 14.3% had children under the age of 18 living with them, 52.7% were married couples living together, 3.6% had a female householder with no husband present, 4.5% had a male householder with no wife present, and 39.3% were non-families. 33.9% of all households were made up of individuals, and 16.1% had someone living alone who was 65 years of age or older. The average household size was 2.04 and the average family size was 2.56.

The median age in the town was 51.6 years. 12.3% of residents were under the age of 18; 5.8% were between the ages of 18 and 24; 16.6% were from 25 to 44; 39.5% were from 45 to 64; and 25.9% were 65 years of age or older. The gender makeup of the town was 54.4% male and 45.6% female.

2000 census

As of the census of 2000, there were 203 people, 89 households, and 63 families living in the town.  The population density was 6.7 people per square mile (2.6/km).  There were 311 housing units at an average density of 10.2 per square mile (3.9/km).  The racial makeup of the town was 98.52% White, 0.49% African American, 0.49% Native American, 0.49% from other races.

There were 89 households, out of which 28.1% had children under the age of 18 living with them, 56.2% were married couples living together, 5.6% had a female householder with no husband present, and 29.2% were non-families. 21.3% of all households were made up of individuals, and 7.9% had someone living alone who was 65 years of age or older.  The average household size was 2.28 and the average family size was 2.60.

In the town, the population was spread out, with 23.2% under the age of 18, 4.4% from 18 to 24, 29.6% from 25 to 44, 32.0% from 45 to 64, and 10.8% who were 65 years of age or older.  The median age was 41 years. For every 100 females, there were 116.0 males.  For every 100 females age 18 and over, there were 110.8 males.

The median income for a household in the town was $21,429, and the median income for a family was $25,000. Males had a median income of $24,583 versus $15,625 for females. The per capita income for the town was $11,493.  About 29.7% of families and 34.5% of the population were below the poverty line, including 50.0% of those under the age of eighteen and 25.0% of those 65 or over.

See also
Butterfield Landing

References

Towns in Aroostook County, Maine
Towns in Maine